Old Macedonian may refer to:

 An alternative name for the Old Church Slavonic language
 The Macedonian recension of Old Church Slavonic (9th–11th century)
 Ancient Macedonian language
 Macedonia (ancient kingdom)
 A period of Macedonian literature from the 9th to the 18th centuries